Attica Holdings S.A. is an operator of international ferry services in Europe. The Group's operations include its subsidiaries Superfast Ferries, which began in 1995 with the launch of its first ships, Superfast I & Superfast II, and Blue Star Ferries which operates ferries in the Aegean Sea to the Greek islands. In June 2018 Attica Group increased its share in Hellenic Seaways to 98.83%. It also has a partnership in Africa Morocco Link which operates mainly in the Strait of Gibraltar.  In Sept 2022 it absorbed 57.70% of ANEK Lines stocks, rendering the operator number two in the number of passengers commuted in Europe.

Company history
1918

The company was established in Piraeus, Greece, under the name "General Company of Commerce and Industry of Greece". In the beginning, it specialised in producing and trading flour under the name of "Attica Flour Mills SA".

1922

The company changed hands and was renamed to Attica Enterprises S.A., subsequently changed to Attica Enterprises Holding S.A. and has since changed to Attica Group.

1924

Two years later in 1924, it was listed on the Athens Stock Exchange.

1993

This year a new management team, chaired by Pericles S. Panagopulos, created the shipping subsidiary Attica Maritime S.A., later renamed to Superfast Ferries Maritime S.A.. The first two Superfast car-passenger ferries, Superfast I and Superfast II, ordered at Schichau Seebeckwerft AG in Bremen, Germany.

1995

In April and June the two ordered car-passenger ferries, Superfast I and Superfast II, delivered and employed in the Patras-Ancona-Patras service. The two ferries revolutionize travel by cutting the crossing time between Patras and Ancona by up to 40%.

1996

July: Two new Superfast car-passenger ferries, Superfast III and Superfast IV, ordered at Kvaerner Masa-Yards in Turku, Finland.

1998

April: Superfast III and Superfast IV delivered and were deployed on the Patras-Ancona-Patras route, while Superfast I and Superfast II launched a new route linking Patras and Igoumenitsa, with Bari in southern Italy.

2006

February: Attica sells its 12.33% stake in Hellenic Seaways acquired a year earlier.

Blue Star Ferries receives the ‘Superbrand’ award recognized as a leading brand in Greece in the ‘Tourism Services’ industry.

March: Blue Star Ferries’ passenger-only catamaran SeaJet 2 is sold. The sale of the vessel is part of the Company's policy to focus on the operation of fast, modern conventional car-passenger vessels.

April: Superfast VII, Superfast VIII and Superfast IX, serving on the Rostock, Germany – Hanko, Finland route in the Baltic Sea are sold to AS Tallink Grupp. The sold vessels will retain their names and continue sailing under the Superfast livery until the end of 2007 at the latest, following an agreement with AS Tallink Grupp.

Attica Group maintains its presence in the Baltic Sea with the operation of its two RoRo vessels, which trade between Rostock, Germany and Uusikaupunki, Finland.

July: Attica's subsidiary, Blue Star Maritime S.A. acquires the total assets of DANE Sea Line for a total of Euro 19.9mln. The assets included car-passenger ferry Diagoras which is deployed to the Dodecanese Islands’ routes in August.

August: Attica enters into an agreement to sell to Veolia Transport its ice-class vessel Superfast X trading between Scotland and Belgium for a total cash consideration of Euro 112mln. The delivery of Superfast X and final payment is to take place at the beginning of 2007.

November: Attica enters into an agreement with Fret Cetam of France for the chartering of RoRo Nordia until October 2008. RoRo Nordia was deployed on the Uusikaupunki, Finland – Rostock, Germany route together with RoRo Marin. As of the beginning of 2007, RoRo Marin is to be redeployed from the Baltic Sea to serve the needs of the Group in the Greece-Italy routes in the Adriatic Sea and in the domestic market.

Blue Star Ferries is voted "Passenger Line of the Year" at Lloyd's List Greek Shipping Awards.

December: Attica Group announces the deployment of Blue Star 1 of its subsidiary Blue Star Ferries to the Scotland-Belgium service as of the end of January 2007. Blue Star 1 is to replace Superfast X which was sold earlier in the year, and is to be delivered to her new owners in February 2007.
 
2007

February: Attica Group increases its stake in Minoan Lines to 22.25%

June: Attica sells its total participation in Minoan Lines S.A.

August: Attica proceeded in the assignment of new offices and new responsibilities to its Board Members. On behalf of its subsidiaries Superfast Ferries and Blue Star Ferries, Attica Group donated the amount of Euro 150,000 to the Special Relief Fund for the benefit of the victims of the recent fires in Greece.

September: Attica Group announces the purchase of two RoPax ships, built in 1998 and 1999.

Attica Group, pursuant to the Law 3556/2007, the Decision 1/434/03.07.2007 and the Circular nr. 33 of the Hellenic Capital Market Commission, announced that Marfin Investment Group Holdings S.A., which is closely associated to the Vice-Chairman of the Board of Directors Mr. Andreas Vgenopoulos, bought shares of the Company as follows:

a) on 20.2.2008 bought 19,295 shares with total net value of Euro 106,292.29
b) on 21.2.2008 bought 10,518 shares with total net value of Euro 57,938.79

2008

September: Zeebrugge-Rosyth route discontinued on 13 September. The service will be restarted in Spring 2009 by Norfolkline.

2009

March: On the 12th Superfast XII inaugurates the Piraeus - Heraklion route.

December:Brittany Ferries entered into a contract to buy the Superfast V from the Attica Group at sum of €81.50 million, with delivery in February 2010. It now serves as the MV Cap Finistère.

2016

June: Africa Morocco Link was created in 2016 following an agreement between BMCE Bank and Attica Group to operate scheduled ferry services from Morocco to Europe, through the newly established Moroccan company Africa Morocco Links ("AML"). Attica Group will hold a 49% participation in the new company, while 51% will be held by a group of Moroccan shareholders, led by BMCE Bank Of Africa Group.

2018

May: The Group acquired the control of "Hellenic Seaways",  by completing the acquisition of the majority of shares  (50.3%).
June: The Group completed the acquisition of an additional 48.53% of the share capital, holding a total of 98,83%. The value of the transaction amounted to 142,9 million €.

2022

Sept: The Group reached agreement to acquire the control of "ANEK Lines".

Controversy
On January 18, 2023, Lighthouse Reports, in collaboration with SRF, ARD, Al Jazeera, Il Domani and Solomon published a report claiming illegal pushbacks of asylum seekers from Italy to Greece using Superfast ferries. If those asylum seekers arrived to the ports of Venice, Ancona, Bari and Brindisi, they were denied the opportunity to seek asylum and were pushed back using ferries operated by Attica Group, specifically Superfast Ferries. Immigrants were put into shower rooms and metal boxes with caged roofs, sometimes being handcuffed to metal shelves.

See also
List of Greek Companies

References

External links
 Attica Group's web site
 Superfast Ferries
 
  The ferry site

Transport companies established in 1918
Companies listed on the Athens Exchange
Shipping companies of Greece
Companies based in Athens
Greek brands
Greek companies established in 1918